Alejandra Marrero (née: Espinoza Cruz; born March 27, 1987) is a Mexican beauty queen, model, and TV presenter. She won the first year of Univision's beauty contest/reality television show Nuestra Belleza Latina on May 22, 2007.

Pageants
Prior to participating in Nuestra Belleza Latina 2007, Espinoza competed in the Nuestra Belleza Mexico 2006 pageant, finishing as 3rd Runner-Up.

Espinoza competed against 11 other finalists on Nuestra Belleza Latina 2007. On the final show hosted by Giselle Blondet, she competed against five remaining finalists with a live performance by Cristian Castro.

Career
In 2007, after winning a contract with the Univision network she joined the show El Gordo y la Flaca as a correspondent and guest co-host. In February 2008, Espinoza became a model and co-presenter on Univision's hit show Sabado Gigante starring Don Francisco. In July 2014, after 6 years of working at Sabado Gigante and appearing in 333 weekly shows, she left the show to pursue other projects in Los Angeles. In 2014, she served as co-host of Nuestra Belleza Latina 2014.

In July 2014, Univision announced that she will be the host of a new reality show and singing competition called La Banda scheduled for 2015. She is represented by MC2 Model Management in Miami.

Personal life
Espinoza was born in Tijuana and comes from a family of ten children. Her mother's name is Rosa María and she emigrated with her family to San Ysidro, California in 2001. Espinoza worked at a fast food restaurant and participated in beauty pageants in her free time.

In 2011, Espinoza wed boyfriend Aníbal Marrero. In 2015, their first child, son Matteo, was born.

Filmography

Film

Television

Music videos

References

Notes

External links
 Reinas Alejandra Espinoza Retrieved: 30 April 2019. 
 

1987 births
Living people
Mexican beauty pageant winners
Mexican emigrants to the United States
Nuestra Belleza Latina winners
People from Tijuana